Mahoning Township is a township in Montour County, Pennsylvania, United States.

Geography

According to the United States Census Bureau, the township has a total area of 8.9 square miles (22.9 km2), of which 8.2 square miles (21.3 km2)  is land and 0.6 square miles (1.6 km2)  (7.00%) is water.

Demographics

As of the census of 2000, there were 4,263 people, 1,466 households, and 963 families residing in the township.

The population density was 517.3 people per square mile (199.8/km2). There were 1,542 housing units at an average density of 187.1/sq mi (72.3/km2).

The racial makeup of the township was 93.97% White, 1.92% African American, 0.02% Native American, 2.72% Asian, 0.61% from other races, and 0.75% from two or more races. Hispanic or Latino of any race were 1.71% of the population.

There were 1,466 households, out of which 29.4% had children under the age of eighteen living with them; 54.6% were married couples living together, 8.6% had a female householder with no husband present, and 34.3% were non-families. 32.1% of all households were made up of individuals, and 15.8% had someone living alone who was sixty-five years of age or older.

The average household size was 2.32 and the average family size was 2.92.

In the township the population was spread out, with 22.3% under the age of eighteen, 5.2% from eighteen to twenty-four, 22.3% from twenty-five to forty-four, 24.1% from forty-five to sixty-four, and 26.0% who were sixty-five years of age or older. The median age was forty-five years.

For every one hundred females, there were 78.2 males. For every one hundred females aged eighteen and over, there were 72.0 males.

The median income for a household in the township was $43,995, and the median income for a family was $55,536. Males had a median income of $46,016 compared with that of $31,078 for females.

The per capita income for the township was $24,099.

Roughly 2.4% of families and 8.3% of the population were living below the poverty line, including 5.7% of those under the age of eighteen and 18.5% of those who were aged sixty-five or over.

References

External links
Mahoning Township, Montour County, Pennsylvania (official website)

Populated places established in 1775
Bloomsburg–Berwick metropolitan area
Townships in Montour County, Pennsylvania
Townships in Pennsylvania